L'A. O. F.  (L'A.O.F.: echo de la côte occidentale d'Afrique: journal hebdomadaire d'informations) was a weekly newspaper published from Dakar, Senegal. L'A. O. F. was politically aligned with the French Section of the Workers' International. The paper existed between 1907 and 1958.

References

Defunct newspapers published in Senegal
Defunct weekly newspapers
French-language communist newspapers
French-language newspapers published in Africa
Mass media in Dakar
Newspapers published in Senegal
Newspapers established in 1907
Publications disestablished in 1958
Socialist newspapers